Tariffs, Blockades, and Inflation: The Economics of the Civil War is an economics book written by Mark Thornton and Robert Ekelund. The book, written from an Austrian School viewpoint, covers the socioeconomic situations of the American Civil War.

References

External links 

Preview of book on Google Books

Books about economic history
2004 non-fiction books
Austrian School publications
History books about the American Civil War